Tolworth Hospital is a health facility in Tolworth, London. It is managed by the South West London and St George's Mental Health NHS Trust.

History
The facility, which was designed by William Jacomb Gibbon and Walter Henry Woodroffe as an isolation hospital, was completed in 1889. After one ward was badly damaged by two bombs in November 1940 during the Second World War, it joined the National Health Service in 1948. In the 1960s the hospital became more focused on geriatric work and new facilities were opened by Princess Alexandra in February 1969. In February 2018 the trust announced plans to carry out an extensive redevelopment of the site.

References

External links
Official site

Hospital buildings completed in 1889
Hospitals established in 1889
1889 establishments in England
NHS hospitals in London